Darkest Angels is the first compilation album by South Korean boy band VIXX. The album was released on July 2, 2014 in Japan under the labels of Jellyfish Entertainment and CJ Victor Entertainment. To commemorate and promote the album, VIXX held a high-touch event for fans in Tokyo on the 5th and 6 July 2014. The album placed at number 10 for five consecutive weeks on the Oricon chart and sold 12,332 copies.

Track listing

References

External links

 
 
 
 
 

 
 
 
 

2014 compilation albums
VIXX albums
Jellyfish Entertainment compilation albums
Victor Entertainment compilation albums
K-pop compilation albums
Korean-language compilation albums